Ramsthal is a municipality  in the district of Bad Kissingen in Bavaria in Germany.

References

Bad Kissingen (district)